The Day of Judgment is a novel written by Sardinian jurist and writer Salvatore Satta.

It was published in 1977, after his death. Translated in different languages, it was widely read across Europe.

References

1977 novels
Sardinian literature